David L. S. Brodie (29 May 1910 – 6 June 1996) was a British and Scottish International field hockey player who competed in the 1948 Summer Olympics.

He was a member of the British field hockey team, which won the silver medal.

References

External links
 
David Brodie's obituary

1910 births
1996 deaths
British male field hockey players
Olympic field hockey players of Great Britain
Field hockey players at the 1948 Summer Olympics
Olympic silver medallists for Great Britain
Olympic medalists in field hockey
Medalists at the 1948 Summer Olympics